Craig Martin Davies (born 9 January 1986) is a former professional footballer who played as a striker. Born in England, he was capped seven times for Wales in an eight-year international career.

He started his career at Manchester City, though became a first team regular at Oxford United between 2004 and 2006. He spent a brief time in Italy with Hellas Verona, but swiftly returned to England on loan with Wolverhampton Wanderers, before signing with Oldham Athletic in 2007. Spending time on loan with Stockport County in 2008, he left Oldham the following year and signed to Brighton & Hove Albion. Enjoying loan spells with Yeovil Town and Port Vale, he transferred permanently to Chesterfield in 2010, who he helped to win the League Two title in his first season. He signed with Barnsley in July 2011, before being sold to Bolton Wanderers for £300,000 in January 2013. He joined Preston North End on loan 12 months later after losing his place in the Bolton team. He signed with Wigan Athletic in July 2015, and helped the club to win promotion as champions of League One. He joined Scunthorpe United in January 2017, and then rejoined Oldham Athletic five months later. He was sold on to Mansfield Town in June 2018 and stayed with the club for two years.

Club career

Manchester City to Oxford
Davies was a member of the youth team at Shrewsbury Town, and then Manchester City, before moving on to Oxford United in August 2004. He made his league debut on 30 August 2004 in a 1–0 win at Notts County. He signed a contract extension in February 2005. He went on to score 8 goals in 29 appearances for the first team during the season and came close to signing for Premier League side Charlton Athletic in June 2005.

Hellas Verona
Davies moved to Hellas Verona of Serie B in January 2006 for a fee of £85,000. He hoped the move would improve his international prospects. He signed a five-year contract, but managed only one appearance for the Italian club.

Wolverhampton Wanderers
In July 2006, Davies had a trial at Northampton Town. The next month he moved on loan to Championship side Wolverhampton Wanderers, claiming he wanted out of Italy as he was too young to adapt to the change in culture. He was a regular choice throughout the first half of the 2006–07 season, but found himself largely unused after the January transfer window saw Wolves sign striker Andy Keogh. He never managed a league goal for the club in 23 games, but did score twice in the FA Cup, ironically against the club he would join permanently, Oldham Athletic, once in the original tie and again in the replay.

Oldham Athletic
After Wolves opted not to make his loan a permanent move, Davies signed for League One side Oldham Athletic in June 2007 for an undisclosed fee. He marked his debut against Swansea City by scoring a last minute winner, and immediately became a first choice player. In August 2008 he signed a contract extension to keep him at Oldham until summer 2010. Three months later, Davies was loaned to Oldham's League One rivals Stockport County to regain form after a poor start to the season, failing to score in ten appearances. He made 13 appearances for Stockport, scoring six goals, including a hat-trick over Bristol Rovers. County showed interest in signing him permanently.

Brighton & Hove Albion
In January 2009, Davies agreed a transfer to League One side Brighton & Hove Albion for an undisclosed fee believed to be £150,000; the transfer was completed on 2 February. On 10 February, Davies made his debut and scored his first goal for the club in a 4–2 loss to Peterborough United, scoring in the 27th-minute for the first goal of the game. New manager Russell Slade steered the club away from relegation despite injuries to the front two of Nicky Forster and Glenn Murray; Davies failed to add to his goal tally in ten starts and six substitute appearances, though late loan arrival Lloyd Owusu managed to find the form to help fire Brighton to safety.

On 25 September 2009, Davies joined League One rivals Yeovil Town on loan, initially for one-month. He made his debut for Yeovil on 26 September in a 2–0 win over Brentford at Huish Park.

On 15 January 2010, Davies joined League Two side Port Vale on an initial one-month loan deal, rejoining Micky Adams, the manager who had signed him for Brighton. He hoped this loan move could reignite his career at the Withdean Stadium, and end his eleven-month goal drought. He quickly earned the praise of teammate Marc Richards, who said: "Craig is big, tall and strong, which is everything a good striker would want, and he can score goals as well". Assistant manager Geoff Horsfield said Davies' signing was "fantastic for the club".

He made a highly impressive start during his first two appearances, and ended his year-long goal drought in his fourth. His loan deal was then quickly extended until the end of the season. He finished the campaign with seven goals in 24 games for the Vale.

Chesterfield
On 6 July 2010, Davies had his Brighton contract cancelled by mutual consent. Later that same day, Davies signed a one-year contract with League Two side Chesterfield. He made history when in a 5–4 pre-season friendly defeat to Derby County he became the first player to score at Chesterfield's new B2net Stadium. A similar, more dubious honour came on 7 August 2010, when in a 2–1 win over Barnet he became the first player to be sent off at the stadium – also his competitive debut for the club. His eleven goals in his opening thirteen league games helped to propel his side to the top of the league, and he was made the division's Player of the Month for October after scoring five goals in six games. He again won the same honour for the month of March, tallying up six goals in six games. Chesterfield ended the season as league champions, thereby winning promotion to League One. Davies finished with 23 league goals to his name, putting him joint fourth (with Adam Le Fondre) in the division's scoring charts - five goals above striker partner Jack Lester, but five goals behind Crewe Alexandra's Clayton Donaldson. He was also named in the PFA Team of the Year, along with teammates Danny Whitaker and Tommy Lee.

Barnsley
Davies' highly successful season with Chesterfield earned him attention from numerous Championship clubs, including Reading. However it was Barnsley manager Keith Hill who was able to tempt the young striker, who signed a contract with the club in July 2011. It took until his ninth appearance for Davies find his first goal for the club, when he struck from 12 yards out in a 2–1 defeat to Bristol City at Oakwell. This was the first of a streak of eight goals in eight games, during which he scored twice against Doncaster Rovers and Ipswich Town. He finished the 2011–12 campaign with 11 goals in 42 appearances.

On 22 September, Davies scored four goals in the space of 19 second-half minutes in a 5–0 demolition of Birmingham City at St Andrew's, earning himself a place on the Championship team of the week. On 17 November, he marked his return from almost a month out with a hamstring problem with the equalizing goal in a 1–1 draw with Bolton Wanderers at The Reebok. He totalled nine goals for the "Tykes" in 22 appearances in the first half of the 2012–13 campaign.

Bolton Wanderers

In January 2013, Bolton Wanderers made a successful £300,000 transfer bid for Davies, and began negotiating personal terms. He agreed to a two-and-a-half-year deal, and became Dougie Freedman's first permanent signing as the "Trotters" manager. He made his debut for Bolton on 19 January, as a late substitute for Darren Pratley in a goalless draw with Crystal Palace at Selhurst Park. He scored his first goal for Bolton on 9 February in a 2–1 win over Burnley at the Reebok Stadium, and followed this up with the equalising goal for Bolton in a 1–1 draw with Nottingham Forest at the City Ground just a week later. He was sent off after receiving two yellow cards in a 3–2 defeat to Charlton Athletic at The Valley on 30 March.

He played ten games without scoring a goal as he struggled with injuries during the first half of the 2013–14 season. On 31 January 2014, Davies joined Preston North End on loan for the rest of the season, where he scored five goals in fifteen appearances. He marked his debut at Deepdale the following day with the opening goal of a 2–0 win over Notts County. On 12 April, he scored a hat-trick for the Lilywhites in a 6–1 home win over Carlisle United. Simon Grayson's Lilywhites went on to secure a play-off place at the end of the 2013–14 season, losing to Rotherham United at the semi-final stage.

In the 2014–15 season, Davies struggled with hamstring problems, as did a number of his teammates. On 6 April, he scored a second half brace in an away game against Cardiff City, but yet again he pulled up in training later that week with another hamstring injury. He was released by manager Neil Lennon in May 2015.

Wigan Athletic
In July 2015, Davies signed a two-year contract with newly relegated League One side Wigan Athletic after securing his release from Bolton; "Latics" manager Gary Caldwell said that he was "a powerful striker who has a proven track record in this division". He scored two goals in 30 appearances across the 2015–16 campaign as Wigan won promotion as champions of League One.

Scunthorpe United
On 7 January 2017, Davies joined League One club Scunthorpe United on a contract until the end of the 2016–17 season. He failed to score in 21 appearances in the second half of the campaign, though was predominantly a substitute and only made three league starts.

Return to Oldham
In June 2017, Davies rejoined Oldham Athletic – again in League One – on a two-year deal, as manager John Sheridan's second summer signing. He was linked with a move to Coventry City in the January transfer window, but new manager Richie Wellens stated that it would be "suicidal" of the club to accept any offer. Davies ended the 2017–18 campaign with 14 goals in 44 appearances, but could not prevent Oldham being relegated into League Two. After leaving Oldham he slammed chairman Abdallah Lemsagam for his treatment of staff.

Mansfield Town
On 29 June 2018, Davies signed a two-year contract with League Two club Mansfield Town after the "Stags" paid Oldham an undisclosed fee. He was reported to have been playing at "about 60 per cent of capacity" in the first half of the 2018–19 season due to bits of flaked-off bone getting trapped in his ankle joints and causing him constant pain; he underwent surgery in December and was ruled out of action for the rest of the season. He managed to make only five appearances during the 2019–20 season, but was just getting back to match fitness when the season was ended in March due to the COVID-19 pandemic in England. He was released by manager Graham Coughlan at the end of the campaign.

International career
Davies holds a record for the Wales under-21 team by being one of only four people to have scored a hat trick at that level alongside John Hartson, Lee Jones and Ched Evans. This feat saw him earn a call-up to the senior squad. However, he was sent off in August 2006 in a 3–2 defeat by Israel under-21s, and received a five-match international ban.

He was capped seven times by Wales, qualifying through a grandparent, having made his international debut as a substitute in a goalless draw with Slovenia on 17 August 2005. Two months later he withdrew from the international squad due to personal reasons.

He was re-called to the squad in January 2008 for a friendly with Norway at Wrexham, after serving eighteen months out due to international suspension. A further re-call in August 2008 was denied by his club Oldham due to a disciplinary issue. He was called up to feature in qualification to the 2014 FIFA World Cup, and came on as a second-half substitute against Scotland on 12 October 2012.

Personal life
In May 2007, he was handed a four-month suspended prison sentence for harassment and given a five-year restraining order banning him from contacting his former girlfriend. In February 2015, he was called a 'Good Samaritan' after assisting an elderly couple who had broken down in a hire car.

Career statistics

Club

International

Honours
Individual
 League Two Player of the Month: October 2010 & March 2011
 League Two PFA Team of the Year: 2010–11

Chesterfield
 League Two: 2010–11

Wigan Athletic
 League One: 2015–16

References

External links

1986 births
Living people
Sportspeople from Burton upon Trent
Association football forwards
Black British sportsmen
English footballers
English people of Welsh descent
Welsh footballers
Wales youth international footballers
Wales under-21 international footballers
Wales international footballers
Welsh expatriate footballers
Welsh expatriate sportspeople in Italy
Expatriate footballers in Italy
Shrewsbury Town F.C. players
Manchester City F.C. players
Oxford United F.C. players
Hellas Verona F.C. players
Wolverhampton Wanderers F.C. players
Oldham Athletic A.F.C. players
Stockport County F.C. players
Brighton & Hove Albion F.C. players
Yeovil Town F.C. players
Port Vale F.C. players
Chesterfield F.C. players
Barnsley F.C. players
Bolton Wanderers F.C. players
Preston North End F.C. players
Wigan Athletic F.C. players
Scunthorpe United F.C. players
Mansfield Town F.C. players
English Football League players
Serie B players